Tucminae is a subfamily of flies belonging to the family Lesser Dung flies from Argentina.

Genera
Tucma Mourguès-Schurter, 1987

References

Sphaeroceridae
Diptera of South America